Bruce K. Kauika-Petersen (born 1 January 1990) is a New Zealand rugby union player who plays for  in the National Provincial Championship. His position is hooker.

Reference list

External links
itsrugby.co.uk profile

1990 births
New Zealand rugby union players
Living people
Rugby union hookers
Wellington rugby union players
Hurricanes (rugby union) players
Northland rugby union players